Wychwood Brewery is a brewery in Witney, Oxfordshire, England, owned by Marston's. The company's flagship brand is Hobgoblin, a 5.2% abv brown ale.

Wychwood Brewery produces around 50,000 barrels of cask ale each year, and is the United Kingdom's largest brewer of organic ales. Wychwood filtered and bottled beers are exported all over the world, including North America, Germany, Sweden, France, Australia, Russia, Japan, Israel and Singapore.
 
The brewery is known for its character-based label artwork, inspired by the myths and legends surrounding the ancient Wychwood Forest.

History 

The brewery is sited at the old Eagle Maltings, built in 1841 to malt barley for Clinch's brewery which had an estate of seventy-one pubs in Southern England. In 1961, Courage bought Clinch's for its pub estate and closed down the brewery.

In 1983, part of the original Clinch's Eagle Brewery site was rented by Paddy Kenny, but named the brewing company Kenny Brewery. Chris Moss took his interest in exchange for a debt from Paddy and took over after Paddy Kenny moved away. In 1990, the Eagle was renamed the Wychwood Brewery after the ancient Wychwood Forest which borders Witney, at the same time the brewery moved to the Two Rivers Industrial estate still in Witney. In 1994 the brewery was moved back to the site taking on more of the old site.  The brewery was taken over in 2002 by Refresh UK, a subsidiary of Marston's. Marston's then bought Refresh and Wychwood Brewery outright in 2008.

Beers

Hobgoblin
Hobgoblin is the best-known and most popular beer brewed at Wychwood Brewery and was created by Chris Moss. It is 5.2% abv in bottles, 4.5% in cans and 4.5% (previously 5.0%, and before that 5.6%, and originally 6.5%) on cask, and is described by Wychwood as a "Ruby beer". Jeremy Moss, Wychwood's head brewer, describes the drink as "full bodied and well balanced with a chocolate toffee malt flavour, moderate bitterness and a distinctive fruity character with a ruby red glow". It was the first bottled beer in the UK to feature an illustrated label, as opposed to a simple text-based one, and it is currently the second best-selling bottled ale in the UK.

During a meeting at the 2010 G-20 Toronto summit, Prime Minister David Cameron and President Barack Obama gave each other bottles of beer from their respective home towns/cities, with Cameron presenting Obama with twelve bottles of Hobgoblin, which is brewed in his Witney constituency. In return Obama gave Cameron 24 bottles of Goose Island beer, from Goose Island Brewery. The President remarked that he would drink his beer chilled, as opposed to the optimal room temperature (15.5 °C/59.9 °F) at which strong ale should be drunk, prompting Wychwood to create a T-shirt in their online store reading "What's the matter Obama, afraid you might taste something?".

King Goblin
King Goblin, essentially a stronger and more flavourful variety of Hobgoblin, is a 6.6% abv "Special Reserve" ale. To date it is available bottled in Asda, Sainsburys, Morrisons and Tesco supermarkets, Draeger's supermarkets in the US, in "Broken English" shops in Berlin, and on draught during "real ale" festivals at Wetherspoons pubs.

Brakspear 
Wychwood took over the brewing of the newly acquired Brakspear beers in October 2002. The new Brakspear brewery was integrated into an expansion of the Wychwood plant, and includes parts of the copper (boiling vessel), as well as some of the fermenting vessels which themselves had been refurbished at Henley. There is only one brewhouse at Witney but two separate fermenting rooms for the separate Wychwood and Brakspear beers. The Brakspear beers are still brewed in Witney by Wychwood and not in Henley, where the original brewery site has been converted into a boutique hotel.

Hatherwood 
Using the name Hatherwood Brewery, Wychwood brews beers exclusively for the supermarket Lidl. These include:
 Golden Goose
 Ruby Rooster 
 Green Gecko
 Amber Adder
 Purple Panther (porter, 5% ABV)
 Gnarly Fox
 Total Legend (golden ale, 4.5% ABV)

References

External links
 Official Wychwood Brewery Website
 Quaffale
 Refresh UK website
 Opening Times Supermarkets

Companies based in Oxfordshire
Witney
Food and drink companies established in 1983
Breweries in England
British companies established in 1983
1983 establishments in England